Acalypta marginata is a species of lace bug in the family Tingidae. It is found throughout the Palearctic and in three eastern Asian countries: Japan, Korea and Mongolia. 

It was originally described in 1804 by Johann Friedrich Wolff. 

Acalypta marginata seems to prefer drier habitats but has been recorded from a diverse range of habitat types including humid treeless communities, dry grasslands, humid/riverine woodlands and dry forests.

Gallery

References

Tingidae
Insects described in 1804
Hemiptera of Europe